Lithraea  is a genus of three species of flowering plants in the cashew family, Anacardiaceae. It is native to Argentina, Bolivia, Brazil, Chile, Paraguay, and Uruguay. They are dioecious trees with poisonous sap that can induce contact dermatitis.

References

External links

 
Anacardiaceae genera
Dioecious plants